Vis, ViS, VIS, and other capitalizations may refer to:

Places 
 Vis (island), a Croatian island in the Adriatic sea
 Vis (town), on the island of Vis
 Vis (river), in south-central France
 Vis, Bulgaria, a village in Haskovo Province
 Visalia Municipal Airport (IATA and FAA:VIS), Visalia, California
 Viš, a village in Montenegro

Organizations 
 Vanguard International Semiconductor Corporation, an IC foundry in Taipei, Taiwan
 Vasil Iliev Security (VIS and VIS-2), former front companies for a criminal organization in Bulgaria
 Vatican Information Service, the official news service of the Vatican
 VAZInterService, an automobile manufacturer in Russia
 Vavoua International School, an international boarding school in Côte d'Ivoire
 Victorian Institute of Sport, a government sporting institute in Victoria, Australia
 Vienna Independent Shorts, an annual international film festival in Vienna, Austria
 Vienna International School, a school for the children of UN employees and diplomats in Vienna, Austria
 VIS Entertainment, a former video game developer in Scotland
 Viacom International Studios, a division of Paramount International Networks

Science and technology 
 Vaccine Information Statement, a formal vaccine description published by the United States Centers for Disease Control
 Variable Intake System, a technology of internal combustion engines
 Tandy Video Information System, a multimedia CD-ROM console from the early 1990s
 Viewable image size, the amount of screen space available on display without obstruction
 Visible spectrum, the portion of the electromagnetic radiation spectrum that is visible to the human eyes
 Visual Instruction Set, a SIMD instruction set for SPARC processors
 Visa Information System, a biometric database for visa applications in the Schengen area of the EU

Other uses
 Vis (surname), a Dutch surname, including a list of people named Vis
 vis, the possessive form of the English neologistic gender-neutral pronoun ve
 FB Vis, a type of Polish handgun
 The heroine of the 11th century Persian love story Vis and Rāmin
 Willem C. Vis Moot, an international arbitration moot court held annually in Vienna, Austria

See also
 Vis-à-vis (disambiguation)
 Visibility (disambiguation)
 Viz (disambiguation)